The 1940–41 Cupa României was the eighth edition of Romania's most prestigious football cup competition.

The trophy was won by Rapid București for the fifth time in a row and for the sixth time from eight editions played. They defeated Unirea Tricolor București.
For Unirea Tricolor București it was the second final lost after the 1936 Cupa României Final.

The final was postponed several times by the organizers because of the uncertainty caused by the beginning of the World War II. Finally, the last act was scheduled on 7 September 1941. The match ball is said to have been a Soviet football found in Tiraspol; after the game, the ball was after offered to the winners.

Format
The competition is an annual knockout tournament with pairings for each round drawn at random.

There are no seeds for the draw. The draw also determines which teams will play at home. Each tie is played as a single leg.

If a match is drawn after 90 minutes, the game goes in extra time, and if the scored is still tight after 120 minutes, there a replay will be played, usually at the ground of the team who were away for the first game.

From the first edition, the teams from Divizia A entered in competition in sixteen finals, rule which remained till today.

The format is almost similar with the oldest recognised football tournament in the world FA Cup.

First round proper

|colspan=3 style="background-color:#FFCCCC;"|16 October 1940

|-
|colspan=3 style="background-color:#FFCCCC;"|27 October 1940

|-
|colspan=3 style="background-color:#FFCCCC;"|8 November 1940

|}

Second round proper

|colspan=3 style="background-color:#FFCCCC;"|20 April 1941

|-
|colspan=3 style="background-color:#FFCCCC;"|23 April 1941

|-
|colspan=3 style="background-color:#FFCCCC;"|24 April 1941

|}

Quarter-finals 

|colspan=3 style="background-color:#FFCCCC;"|22 May 1941

|-
|colspan=3 style="background-color:#FFCCCC;"|25 May 1941

|}

Semi-finals

|colspan=3 style="background-color:#FFCCCC;"|11 June 1941

|}

Final

References

External links
 romaniansoccer.ro
 Official site
 The Romanian Cup on the FRF's official site

Cupa României seasons
Cupa
Romania